The giant pitta (Hydrornis caeruleus) is a species of bird in the family Pittidae.

Distribution and habitat

The giant pitta is native to Brunei, Indonesia, Malaysia, Myanmar, and Thailand. It appears to prefer densely vegetated, swampy areas, but has infrequently been reported from drier and secondary vegetation.

Conservation
The species is classified as Near Threatened by the IUCN. Total population size is unknown, but it is believed to be scarce to rare, and thought to be under pressure from rapid forest loss in its native habitat.

References

Hydrornis
Birds of the Malay Peninsula
Birds of Malaysia
Birds of Borneo
Birds described in 1822
Taxonomy articles created by Polbot